The National University of the Chaco Austral (Universidad Nacional del Chaco Austral - UNCAus) is a very recently established national university located in Sáenz Peña, a city in the agrarian, central section of Chaco Province, Argentina. It was established in 2007 by an initiative of Governor Jorge Capitanich, and was included as part of a plan to geographically diversify Argentina's National University system; as such, its installations consist of the former local campus of the National University of the Northeast, notably the School of Agronomy and Forestry, and new additions.

External links
Science and Education in Argentina
Argentine Higher Education Official Site 
Official website 

2007 establishments in Argentina
Argentine national universities
Educational institutions established in 2007
Universities in Chaco Province